, occasionally nicknamed Asami, is a Japanese female mixed martial artist. She currently fights in the Jewels promotion, where she won the 2009 Jewels Rough Stone Grand Prix (48 kg & under).

Early life

Mixed martial arts career

Kodera would return to Smackgirl, losing against Masako Yoshida by unanimous decision.

Mixed martial arts record

|-
| Win
| align=center| 5-3-0
| Kikuyo Ishikawa
| Decision (unanimous)
| Jewels 6th Ring
| 
| align=center| 2
| align=center| 5:00
| Kabukicho, Tokyo, Japan
| 
|-
| Win
| align=center| 4-3-0
| Misaki Ozawa
| Submission (armbar)
| Jewels 5th Ring
| 
| align=center| 2
| align=center| 1:56
| Kabukicho, Tokyo, Japan
| 
|-
| Win
| align=center| 3-3-0
| Yukiko Seki
| Submission (armbar)
| Jewels 4th Ring
| 
| align=center| 1
| align=center| 4:47
| Tokyo, Japan
| 
|-
| Loss
| align=center| 2-3-0
| Mika Nagano
| Decision (split)
| Smackgirl - World ReMix 2008 Second Round
| 
| align=center| 2
| align=center| 5:00
| Bunkyo, Tokyo, Japan
| 
|-
| Loss
| align=center| 2-2-0
| Masako Yoshida
| Decision (unanimous)
| Smackgirl - World ReMix 2008 Opening Round
| 
| align=center| 2
| align=center| 5:00
| Bunkyo, Tokyo, Japan
| 
|-
| Win
| align=center| 2-1-0
| Mamiko Mizoguchi
| Submission (armbar)
| Kingdom of Grapple - Live 2007
| 
| align=center| 2
| align=center| 1:49
| Kabukicho, Tokyo, Japan
| 
|-
| Loss
| align=center| 1-1-0
| Mari Kaneko
| Submission (rear-naked choke)
| Golden Muscle - Strongest Queen Tournament
| 
| align=center| 1
| align=center| 1:17
| Tokyo, Japan
| 
|-
| Win
| align=center| 1-0-0
| Nana Ichikawa
| Submission (armbar)
| Smackgirl - Japan Cup 2002 Episode 2
| 
| align=center| 1
| align=center| 2:08
| Tokyo, Japan
|

Championships and accomplishments
 2009 Jewels Rough Stone Grand Prix 48 kg Champion

See also
 List of female mixed martial artists

References

External links
 Asami Kodera Awakening Profile

Profile at Fightergirls.com
Official blog 

1978 births
Living people
Japanese female mixed martial artists
Mixed martial artists utilizing jujutsu
Japanese jujutsuka
21st-century Japanese women